Treasury Men in Action (also known as Federal Men) is an American crime drama series broadcast live and which aired from September 11, 1950, through April 1951 on ABC and then on NBC through 1955. The series stars Walter Greaza, Ross Martin, and Tom McKee.

Overview
The series was an anthology drama dramatizing cases from one of the various law enforcement agencies that operated under the US Treasury Department. The host was Walter Greaza, who introduced each episode as "The Chief" of whichever agency was featured in a given episode.   Counterfeiters, tax evaders, smugglers, narcotics traffickers, and other federal offenders whose crimes fell within the jurisdiction of Treasury were pursued.  Cases from the files of the US Secret Service, the Customs Bureau. the Alcohol Tax Unit, the Intelligence Division of the Internal Revenue Service, and the Federal Bureau of Narcotics were dramatized.

Other actors who appeared in this series include Claude Akins, Charles Bronson, Jesse White, James Dean, Vivi Janiss, Carolyn Jones, and Harry Lauter.

Treasury Men in Action finished at #27 in the Nielsen ratings for the 1952–1953 season and #15 for 1953–1954. It appeared in reruns under the title of Federal Men.

Production 
In an interview with Kliph Nesteroff, assistant director Arthur Marks stated the show was shot at the same time and on the same sets as The Man Behind the Badge.

Everett Rosenthal was the producer. It was directed by, among others, David Pressman, William Beaudine, Leigh Jason, and Will Jason among others.

Chrysler Motors and Borden's Instant Coffee sponsored the program.

References

External links
 

1950 American television series debuts
1955 American television series endings
1950s American crime drama television series
1950s American anthology television series
American Broadcasting Company original programming
Black-and-white American television shows
English-language television shows
American live television series
United States Department of the Treasury